Ceroxylon sasaimae, also known as the Sasaima wax palm is a species of flowering plant in the family Arecaceae. It is found only in Colombia. It is threatened by habitat loss.

References

sasaimae
Flora of the Andes
Critically endangered plants
Endemic flora of Colombia
Taxonomy articles created by Polbot